Nikola Šakić (born 2 October 1995) is a Serbian football midfielder who plays for Crvenka.

Honours
Napredak Kruševac
Serbian First League: 2015–16

References

External links
 
 Nikola Šakić stats at utakmica.rs

1995 births
Living people
Sportspeople from Sombor
Association football midfielders
Serbian footballers
FK Čukarički players
FK Sinđelić Beograd players
FK Kolubara players
FK Napredak Kruševac players
FK Proleter Novi Sad players
FK Crvenka players
Serbian First League players
Serbian SuperLiga players